Tegna Inc. (stylized in all caps as TEGNA) is an American publicly traded broadcast, digital media and marketing services company headquartered in Tysons Corner, Virginia. It was created on June 29, 2015, when the Gannett Company split into two publicly traded companies. Tegna comprised the more profitable broadcast television and digital media divisions of the old Gannett, while Gannett's publishing interests were spun off as a "new" company that retained the Gannett name. Tegna owns or operates 66 television stations in 54 markets, and holds properties in digital media.

In terms of audience reach, Tegna is the largest group owner of NBC-affiliated stations, ahead of Hearst Television and Sinclair Broadcast Group, and the fourth-largest group owner of ABC affiliates, behind Hearst, the E. W. Scripps Company, and Sinclair. Tegna also owns three digital multicast networks (True Crime Network, Quest, and Twist).

History
In June 2015, Gannett spun off its broadcasting division. Robert Dickey – who led Gannett's newspaper group – would continue as CEO of the company as a sole newspaper publisher, leaving the former broadcasting and digital operations under the leadership of Gracia Martore. In a statement, she explained that the split plans were "significant next steps in our ongoing initiatives to increase shareholder value by building scale, increasing cash flow, sharpening management focus, and strengthening all of our businesses to compete effectively in today's increasingly digital landscape." Additionally, the company announced that it would buy out the remainder of Classified Ventures (a joint venture between Tegna and several other media companies) for $1.8 billion, giving it full ownership of properties such as Cars.com.

As part of the separation, the company announced that the broadcasting and digital company would be named Tegna—a partial anagram of "Gannett". The spin-out was structured so that "old" Gannett changed its name to Tegna, Inc., then spun off its newspaper holdings into a "new" Gannett. The split was completed on June 29, 2015. Tegna retained "old" Gannett's stock price history, though it trades under a new ticker symbol, TGNA. The "new" Gannett inherited old Gannett's longtime ticker symbol, GCI. The two companies, however, continued to share a headquarters complex.

Tegna also retained G/O Digital, a digital marketing services brand that it launched in August 2013, and the 20 broadcast stations it acquired from Belo Corporation in December 2013 and the six stations it acquired from London Broadcasting Company in July 2014.

In September 2016, Tegna announced plans to spin off Cars.com to create two independent publicly traded companies. Tegna shareholders approved an initial public offering of Cars.com as a publicly traded spin-off in May 2017. Shortly after, Tegna completed the spin-off of Cars.com, which now trades under a new ticker symbol, CARS. Upon the completion of the spin-off, Dave Lougee, president of Tegna Media, was named president and CEO of Tegna and joined the company's board of directors. Gracia Martore, president and CEO of Tegna, retired and stepped down from the board.

Prior to the company's completion of the spin-off of Cars.com, it was reported by DealReporter that Nexstar Media Group may be considering a bid to acquire Tegna. In June 2017, Tegna announced it had entered into a definitive agreement, together with the other owners of CareerBuilder, to sell CareerBuilder to an investor group led by investments funds managed by affiliates of Apollo Global Management and the board of the Ontario Teachers’ Pension Plan.

Tegna and Cooper Media, parent corporation of the Justice Network, announced on November 7, 2017, a new multicast network, Quest. Tegna would be the charter station group as such would receive a minority stake in the network, which launched in January 2018. The range of programming on the network would be engineering and science, human achievements, military history and natural history.

On December 18, 2017, Tegna announced it would acquire KFMB-AM-FM-TV in San Diego from Midwest Television, Inc. for $325 million, pending approval from the Federal Communications Commission. The acquisition was completed on February 15, 2018.

On August 20, 2018, Tegna agreed to purchase two stations spun off from the Gray Television-Raycom Media merger, CBS affiliate WTOL-TV in Toledo (the sale likely includes rights to an existing shared services agreement with American Spirit Media-owned Fox affiliate WUPW) and NBC affiliate KWES-TV in Odessa in order to alleviate ownership conflicts involving Gray's ownership of ABC affiliate WTVG in the Toledo market and CBS affiliate KOSA-TV in the Odessa market.

In March 2019, Tegna announced its formation of VAULT Studios, its first, in-house digital content studio. The studio's first content would be true crime podcasts, drawing on its station news content.

On March 20, 2019, Tegna entered an agreement with Nexstar Media Group to acquire eleven stations for $740 million in order to reduce Nexstar's national ownership reach under the federally imposed 39% cap and alleviate ownership conflicts with existing Nexstar properties once it completes a merger with Tribune Media. Included are stations WOI-DT–KCWI-DT in Des Moines and WQAD-TV, based in Moline, Illinois but also serving neighboring Davenport and Pennsylvania (WPMT/Harrisburg and WNEP-TV/Scranton–Wilkes-Barre). Other Nexstar/Tribune stations going to Tegna are WZDX/Huntsville, KFSM-TV/Fort Smith–Fayetteville, WTIC-TV–WCCT-TV/Hartford, and WATN-TV–WLMT/Memphis. The FCC approved the sale on September 16.

On May 6, 2019, it was reported that Tegna was going to acquire the 85% of the Justice Network and Quest from Cooper Media that it did not own already for $77 Million to close by the end of the second quarter. Cooper Media's president and general manager Brian Weiss transferred to Tegna and continue managing the two networks.

On June 11, 2019, it was reported Tegna Inc. purchased the Dispatch Broadcast Group's television and radio assets, subject to regulatory approval, for $535 million. The purchase includes the WBNS television (CBS affiliate WBNS-TV) and radio (WBNS (AM) and WBNS-FM) stations in Columbus, the Ohio News Network, and NBC affiliate WTHR television in Indianapolis. The sale was approved by the FCC on July 29, 2019, and was completed on August 8.

In December 2019, Tegna agreed to sell KFMB-AM-FM to Local Media San Diego for $5 million; the sale was completed on March 17, 2020.

A carriage dispute with DirecTV, beginning on December 2, 2020, resulted in the removal of at least 60 Tegna stations in 51 markets, covering about 39% of TV homes, from the DirecTV, AT&T U-verse and AT&T TV streaming platforms.

A carriage dispute with Dish Network, beginning on October 6, 2021, resulted in the removal of at least 64 Tegna stations in 53 markets, covering about nearly 3 million customers. On October 18, Dish Network filed a complaint with the Federal Communications Commission against Tegna. However, on February 4, 2022, Dish Network finally reached to an agreement with Tegna, resulting with all Tegna owned stations coming back.

Sale to Standard General and Apollo Global Management 
In 2020, activist shareholder Soo Kim, owner of Standard General, began to pursue control over Tegna, citing its "pattern of passivity" on the market. In March 2020, Tegna stated that it had turned down two acquisition offers by Gray Television and Apollo Global Management, stating that "these two parties made their proposals shortly before the recent market dislocation due to the COVID-19 pandemic and both subsequently informed Tegna that they were ceasing discussions." In regards to other rumored offers from Byron Allen and religious broadcaster TBN (the latter in partnership with Jahm Najafi), the company stated that "the other two parties have not signed confidentiality agreements to enable due diligence and have not delivered any information on financing sources".

Kim began to engage in a proxy fight, with Standard General proposing four nominations to Tegna's board of directors at its next shareholders' meeting in April. Tegna's shareholders chose to re-elect all 12 current board members. Kim accepted the result of the vote, stating that the actions had helped to "[challenge] management’s narrative about the Company’s performance and seeking greater transparency about Tegna’s numbers, acquisition metrics, and engagement with third parties." In 2021, Standard General once again put forward nominees to Tegna's board of directors, alleging that the company was underperforming and had issues with diversity, equity, and inclusion; the latter came after a Black nominee put forward by Standard General withdrew, citing a previous incident involving CEO Dave Lougee in 2014. The company stated that Lougee "immediately acknowledged the incident and has stated that he made a mistake, for which he had apologized immediately at the time".

On February 22, 2022, Tegna announced that it had agreed to be taken private by a group led by Standard General and Apollo Global Management for $24 per-share, valuing the company at $5.4 billion. The company, which will retain the Tegna name, will be controlled by an affiliate of Standard General, with Standard Media CEO Deb McDermott (who previously led Young Broadcasting and Media General) becoming CEO. Affiliates of AGM, as well as Cox Media Group (which is principally owned by AGM, with Cox Enterprises as a minority shareholder) and other investors, will hold non-voting shares in the company. Tegna's digital advertising subsidiary Premion will be held as a standalone business between Standard and CMG. The sale includes a clause that will slowly increase the value that Standard and Apollo will pay per-share if the sale takes longer than nine months to close.

The sale will also result in the realignment of station holdings presently associated with both companies: Standard Media's four stations WDKA, WLNE, KBSI, and KLKN will be sold to Cox Media Group, which will then divest its Boston station WFXT to an affiliate of Standard General, and acquire WFAA/KMPX, KHOU/KTBU, and KVUE, from Tegna.

The sale was approved by Standard General and Apollo Global Management on May 17, 2022. It still awaits FCC approval.

In October 2022, Chair of the House Energy and Commerce Committee Frank Pallone and Speaker of the House Nancy Pelosi issued a letter to the FCC expressing concerns for the transaction, arguing that it "would violate the FCC's mandate by restricting access to local news coverage, cutting jobs at local television stations, and raising prices on consumers." They specifically cited statements by Standard General regarding plans for a Washington, D.C. bureau to produce content for local newscasts, and arguing that Tegna's stations had "too many employees". Standard General responded to the letter, denying that they planned to cut jobs or hub content, and promoting that Tegna would become the largest female-run and minority-owned broadcaster in the United States. They also responded to objections by NewsGuild-CWA describing Standard General as "backed by anonymous investors located in the Cayman Islands", stating that the entirety of its board is represented by U.S. interests.

In February 2023, it was confirmed that the deal would be given a hearing before an administrative law judge, which the FCC Commissioner's Board voted to remand the merger review toward on May 21.

Properties
Tegna owns or operates 68 television stations located in 54 markets (including fourteen duopolies); it also owns two radio stations in Columbus, Ohio. Twenty-two of the company's stations are affiliated with NBC (including one digital subchannel of KBMT and two semi-satellites of KCEN-TV and WCSH), fifteen are affiliated with CBS, thirteen are affiliated with ABC, and six are affiliated with Fox. In addition, the company owns seven CW affiliates (including three digital subchannels of KFMB-TV, KYTX, and WMAZ-TV), three Estrella TV affiliates (including two digital subchannels of KENS and KVUE), ten MyNetworkTV affiliates (including five digital subchannels of KFMB-TV, KIDY, KXVA, WQAD-TV, and WZDX), three independent stations (including two digital subchannels of KTVB and its satellite of KTFT-LD), a low-powered MeTV affiliate, and a Quest owned-and-operated station. It also provides operational services to another Fox affiliate, WUPW in Toledo, through a shared services agreement with that station's owner American Spirit Media (agreements that were carried over from WTOL's previous ownership; ASM had acted in a similar capacity with several stations).

Television stations 
Stations are listed alphabetically by state and city of license.

Networks 
 Idaho's Very Own 24/7 (KTVB 7.2)
 NewsWatch 15
 True Crime Network
 Quest
 Twist

Radio stations

Television shows 

In 2015, Tegna Media test-ran a limited-run informative talk show hosted by Dallas-based bishop T. D. Jakes on its owned stations in Dallas, Atlanta, Minneapolis and Cleveland. The show, titled T.D. Jakes, was co-produced by Debmar-Mercury, Tegna Media, 44 Blue Productions, Jakes' own production company, TDJ Enterprises and EnLight Productions and lasted from August 17, 2016, to September 8, 2017.

On December 9, Tegna greenlit the series for an entire run for the 2016–2017 broadcast season. The series debuted on September 12 on most, if not all Tegna-owned stations, as well as several large markets, including Baltimore (WMAR-TV), Detroit (WMYD), Orlando (WFTV/WRDQ), Chicago (WCIU-TV), San Antonio (KSAT-TV), and San Diego (KGTV). Debmar-Mercury, however, is not participating in the production run, being replaced by independent company Flow Media Partners.

T.D. Jakes ended in September 2017 and was replaced with news and entertainment show Daily Blast Live, which premiered on September 11, 2017.

Other shows Tegna Media has on first-run syndication across most of its stations are Sister Circle (also shown on cable network TV One), and reality competition Sing Like A Star.

In January 2018, Tegna announced a partnership with Sony Pictures Television to handle syndication distribution and advertising sales for its original programs.

Digital sites 
Gannett Company spun-off most of its internet media properties to Tegna. When the total internet media division was part of the Gannett Company, it managed the websites for USA Today, as well as Gannett's newspaper and broadcast properties throughout the United States. It owns:
 G/O Digital
 Premion
 Locked On Podcast Network

Former digital sites 
 Cars.com – Tegna completed the spin-off of Cars.com on June 1, 2017.
 Cofactor Digital (ShopLocal) – On December 15, 2016, sold Cofactor to Liquidus, a digital marketing solutions company.
 CareerBuilder – Sold to Apollo Global Management.

Former broadcast assets

Television stations
Stations are arranged in alphabetical order by state and city of license. The list includes stations owned by Tegna, Inc. during its former existence as the Gannett Company subsidiary Gannett Broadcasting, Inc.
 (**) – Indicates a station that was built and/or signed-on by Gannett.

 1 Owned by Sander Media, LLC, Gannett operated these stations through a shared services agreement (SSA). 
 2 As part of the Gannett/Belo merger, KMOV, KTVK, and KASW were transferred to Sander Media, LLC; Gannett planned to operate the stations through shared service agreements. However, on December 16, 2013, the Department of Justice ordered that the parties (Gannett, Belo and Sander) had a period of 120 days to divest KMOV to a government-approved independent third-party that would be barred from entering into any agreements with Gannett, in order to fully preserve competition in advertising sales with KSDK. On December 23, shortly after the approval and completion of the Gannett/Belo deal, Meredith Corporation announced that it would purchase KMOV, KTVK and KASW in a $407.4 million deal. The KMOV sale was completed on February 28, 2014. The KTVK/KASW sale was completed on June 19.

Cable networks
These cable networks were owned by Belo prior to acquisition by Gannett/Tegna:

 TXCN
 Northwest Cable News

Radio stations

(a partial listing)

Notes

License ownership/operational agreements

Mergers and acquisitions

Satellites, semi-satellites and translators

References

External links 
 

 
Television broadcasting companies of the United States
American companies established in 2015
Mass media companies established in 2015
2015 establishments in Virginia
Companies based in McLean, Virginia
Corporate spin-offs
Companies listed on the New York Stock Exchange
Announced mergers and acquisitions